Felicia Farr (born Olive Dines; October 4, 1932) is an American former actress and model

Early years
Farr was born in Westchester County, New York. She attended Erasmus Hall High School and studied sociology at Penn State.

Career 
Farr began modeling lingerie at age 15. In 1955, she told a wire-service reporter: "I was under age and over-developed ... The agency claimed I was 19 because a state law required underage lingerie models to be chaperoned".

She appeared in several modeling photo shoots and advertisements during the 1950s and 1960s. In 1955, she signed a seven-year contract with Columbia Pictures. 

Her earliest screen appearances date from the mid-1950s. They include three westerns directed by Delmer Daves: Jubal (1956) and 3:10 to Yuma (1957), both starring Glenn Ford, and The Last Wagon (1956), starring Richard Widmark.

Farr's later film appearances include   the bawdy Billy Wilder farce Kiss Me, Stupid (1964) with Dean Martin and Ray Walston as her husband (a role originally intended for Jack Lemmon); Walter Matthau's daughter-in-law in Kotch (1971) (Lemmon's only film as director); and the Don Siegel bank-heist caper Charley Varrick (1973) with Matthau. 

She had more than 30 TV appearances on The Alfred Hitchcock Hour, Bonanza, Ben Casey, Burke's Law, Harry O, and many others.

Personal life 
On September 2, 1949, Dines married actor Lee Farr, a marriage which produced a daughter, Denise Farr, who later became the wife of actor Don Gordon. Farr's second husband was actor Jack Lemmon; they married in 1962 while Lemmon was filming the comedy Irma La Douce in Paris. They remained married until his death in 2001.

During her marriage to Jack Lemmon, Farr gave birth to a daughter, Courtney, in 1966. She is also the stepmother of Lemmon's son, actor and author Chris Lemmon, from his first marriage.

Filmography

Selected television appearances

 Wayfarers (1960)
 Naked City (1960)
 Wagon Train (1961)
 Target: The Corruptors! (1961)
 Ben Casey (1962)
 The Defenders (1962)
 Bonanza (1963) – Episode: "Marie, My Love" as Marie DeMarigny
 The Alfred Hitchcock Hour (1964)
 Burke's Law (1964)
 Bob Hope Presents the Chrysler Theatre (1965)
 Run for Your Life (1967)
 It Takes a Thief (1970)
 Awake and Sing! (1972)

References

External links
 
 

1932 births
Living people
Actresses from New York (state)
American film actresses
American television actresses
Jewish American actresses
People from Westchester County, New York
21st-century American Jews
21st-century American women
Lemmon family